Jeffrey Gilbert Kobernus (born June 30, 1988) is an American former professional baseball second baseman. He played in Major League Baseball (MLB) for the Washington Nationals.

Career

Amateur
Kobernus attended Bishop O'Dowd High School in Oakland, California, and the University of California, Berkeley, where he played college baseball for the California Golden Bears baseball team. In 2008, he played collegiate summer baseball with the Cotuit Kettleers of the Cape Cod Baseball League.

Washington Nationals
The Washington Nationals drafted Kobernus in the second round, with the 50th overall selection, of the 2009 MLB Draft. After the 2012 season, the Boston Red Sox selected Kobernus in the Rule 5 draft, and traded him to the Detroit Tigers. Kobernus competed for a spot with the Tigers as a left fielder, but was returned to the Nationals during spring training.

Kobernus was called up to the Nationals from the Syracuse Chiefs of the Class AAA International League on May 25, 2013. He made his major league debut that day as a pinch runner. The Nationals released Kobernus during spring training in 2015. He played for three minor league teams in the San Francisco Giants organization in 2015, batting a combined .231/.288/.276.

Lancaster Barnstormers
On March 15, 2016, Kobernus signed with the Lancaster Barnstormers of the Atlantic League of Professional Baseball. Bench coach and baseball operations manager Ross Peeples said in a press release: "He is a guy the Nationals moved from second base to the outfield, and he wants to go back to his original position".

Seattle Mariners
On May 18, 2017, Kobernus signed a minor league deal with the Seattle Mariners. He was released on August 13, 2017.

See also
Rule 5 draft results

References

External links

1988 births
Living people
People from San Leandro, California
Baseball players from California
Major League Baseball second basemen
Washington Nationals players
California Golden Bears baseball players
Cotuit Kettleers players
Vermont Lake Monsters players
Hagerstown Suns players
Potomac Nationals players
Harrisburg Senators players
Syracuse Chiefs players
Arizona League Giants players
San Jose Giants players
Lancaster Barnstormers players
Sacramento River Cats players
Arkansas Travelers players